USS Malanao (AG-44) was a commercial cargo ship acquired by the U.S. Navy during World War II. She was used to transport cargo in the South Pacific Ocean, and was decommissioned after the end of the war.

Constructed in California
Malanao (AG 4 ) was built as SS Paraiso by Craig Shipbuilding Co., Long Beach, California, in 1912 and chartered by Pacific Coast Steamship Company of San Francisco, California, in 1914 for merchant service along the coast of northern California and Oregon.

Acquired by Long Beach Steamship Company 27 October 1916, she was subsequently purchased by Oliver J. Olson & Company, of San Francisco 24 July 1918 and renamed SS Florence Olson. For more than two decades she continued to serve as a U.S. West Coast freighter hauling lumber and general cargo.
 
Florence Olson was purchased by the Navy from her owner 3 May 1942; renamed Malanao 6 May 1942; converted for Navy use by General Engineering & Drydock Company, Alameda, California, 23 May 1942; and commissioned 3 June 1942.

World War service 
Following completion of conversion 6 July, Malanao carried a cargo of lumber to the Hawaiian Islands in August. Assigned to Service Squadron 8, Pacific Fleet Service Force, she operated during the remainder of the war among islands of the Hawaiian chain and to islands in Polynesia and the central Pacific Ocean.

Loaded with general cargo, construction equipment, and at times ammunition, in 1943 she completed 23 runs to Hawaiian ports as well as to American bases on Johnston, Palmyra, Christmas, Fanning, and Canton Islands. Shortly after the securing of Makin Island, in the Gilbert Islands, 23 November 1943, she arrived there with general cargo. She maintained her busy pace of operations in 1944 and included three round trips between Hawaii and Seattle, Washington.

During the first six months of 1945 she made 13 supply runs to island bases in the Hawaiian perimeter.
 
Malanao reached Pearl Harbor from her final cargo run 28 June 1945. She remained there until 28 September when she steamed to San Francisco, California, arriving 10 October.

Post-war decommissioning
She decommissioned at Mare Island 18 February 1946, and her name was struck from the Navy List 12 March 1946. Her hull was scrapped at Mare Island 4 June 1946.

References
 
 NavSource Online: Service Ship Photo Archive - AG-44 Malanao

World War II auxiliary ships of the United States
Ships built in Los Angeles
1912 ships
Cargo ships of the United States Navy